Comme à la radio is the fourth album by experimental French singer Brigitte Fontaine, recorded with Areski Belkacem (in their first collaboration) and the Art Ensemble of Chicago. It was released in 1969 on the Saravah label after a series of concerts in 1969. It is Fontaine's most famous album, and is known outside of France on the 1990s alt-rock scene, thanks to laudatory comments from Beck Hansen, or Sonic Youth among others.

The album received the Grand Prix du Disque of the Académie Charles Cros that same year. The single "Comme à la radio" has been covered by Japanese artist Jun Togawa in 2000.

Track listing

Bonus Tracks (CD reissues)

References

1969 albums
Brigitte Fontaine albums
Areski Belkacem albums
Art Ensemble of Chicago albums